Ognjen Kuzmić (born May 16, 1990) is a Serbian professional basketball player for  Crvena zvezda of the Adriatic League and the EuroLeague. He also represented the senior Serbian national basketball team internationally. He was selected with the 52nd overall pick in the 2012 NBA draft by the Golden State Warriors and won the 2015 NBA Championship with that team.

Professional career
Kuzmić started his senior career in Borac Banja Luka and the first basketball steps began in Findo Doboj. After one season, he left to play for Korihait in the Finnish league. In 2010, he returned to Bosnia to play for KK Čelik Zenica.

In 2011, he signed with Unicaja Málaga but played the 2011–12 season with farm team, Clínicas Rincón Benahavís of the Spanish Second League. He also played two games with Unicaja.

In 2012, Unicaja Málaga loaned him to Joventut Badalona.

On September 27, 2013, he signed with the Golden State Warriors. During his rookie and sophomore seasons, he had multiple assignments with the Santa Cruz Warriors of the NBA Development League, earning a mention to the All-NBA Development League Defensive Third Team and winning a D-League championship during the 2014–15 season. To add to his D-League title, he was part of Golden State's championship winning team who defeated the Cleveland Cavaliers in the 2015 NBA Finals. Kuzmić failed to appear in any post-season action due to a recurring left ankle injury.

On July 27, 2015, he signed a two-year deal with the Greek club Panathinaikos. On April 21, 2016, he left PAO.

On July 19, 2016, Kuzmić signed a three-year contract with Crvena zvezda. Kuzmić was named MVP for the month of January in the 2016–17 EuroLeague season.

On July 26, 2017, Kuzmić signed a two-year deal with Real Madrid. In October 2017, he tore the ACL in his left knee and was sidelined for the rest of the season. He returned on the court in 2018–19 season, but soon injured his right ankle and missed considerable time. After recovering from injury, he fell out of Real Madrid's rotation and appeared in only 12 games till the end of the season.

On July 3, 2019, Kuzmić signed a two-year contract for Crvena zvezda. On October 24, 2019, Kuzmić made a season debut against Barcelona, less than four months after sustaining severe injuries in traffic accident. In February 2020, he was loaned to FMP for the rest of the 2019–20 season.

Career statistics

NBA

Regular season

|-
| style="text-align:left;"|
| style="text-align:left;"|Golden State
| 21 || 0 || 4.4 || .385 ||  || .455 || 1.0 || .1 || .1 || .2 || .7
|-
| style="text-align:left; background:#afe6ba;"|
| style="text-align:left;"|Golden State
| 16 || 0 || 4.5 || .667 ||  || 1.000 || 1.1 || .4 || .1 || .1 || 1.3 
|- class="sortbottom"
| style="text-align:center;" colspan="2"|Career
| 37 || 0 || 4.4 || .520 ||  || .600 || 1.0 || .2 || .1 || .1 || .9

Playoffs

|-
| style="text-align:left;"|2014
| style="text-align:left;"|Golden State
| 3 || 0 || 2.7 ||  ||  ||  || 1.3 || .0 || .0 || .0 || .0
|- class="sortbottom"
| style="text-align:center;" colspan="2"|Career
| 3 || 0 || 2.7 ||  ||  ||  || 1.3 || .0 || .0 || .0 || .0

EuroLeague

|-
| style="text-align:left;"|2015–16
| style="text-align:left;"|Panathinaikos
| 25 || 18 || 13.8 || .480 ||  || .682 || 4.1 || .3 || .4 || .3 || 5.1 || 6.1
|-
| style="text-align:left;"|2016–17
| style="text-align:left;"|Crvena zvezda
| 30 || 30 || 20.7 || .549 ||  || .707 || 7.0 || 1.0 || 1.0 || .6 || 9.4 || 13.9
|-
| style="text-align:left; background:#AFE6BA;"|2017–18
| style="text-align:left;" rowspan="2"|Real Madrid
| 2 || 0 || 4.8 || .333 ||  ||  || 2.0 || .0 || .0 || .0 || 1.0 || .5
|-
| style="text-align:left;|2018–19
| 5 || 1 || 6.8 || .364 ||  || .600 || 2.6 || .0 || .2 || .4 || 2.2 || 2.0
|- class="sortbottom"
| style="text-align:center;" colspan="2"|Career
| 62 || 49 || 16.3 || .519 ||  || .695 || 5.3 || .6 || .7 || .4 || 6.8 || 9.3

National team career

Being a Bosnian Serb, Kuzmić was eligible to play for either Bosnia and Herzegovina or Serbia. In May 2013, he turned down a call-up from Bosnia and Herzegovina's head coach Aleksandar Petrović for their EuroBasket 2013 training camp.

In May 2014, Kuzmić publicly stated his desire to play for the Serbian national team. In June 2014, national team head coach Aleksandar Đorđević included him on the preliminary 29-player list for the twelve 2014 World Cup roster spots. Three weeks later, in early July 2014, Kuzmić further made Đorđević's shortened list of 20 players invited for the training camp, however, a fibula injury he picked up during the 2014 NBA Summer League ruled him out.

The following summer at EuroBasket 2015, Kuzmić represented Serbia for the first time at a major tournament. In the first phase of the tournament, the team led by head coach Aleksandar Đorđević dominated its round-robin group with a 5-0 record, and then eliminated Finland and Czech Republic in the round-of-16 and quarterfinal games, respectively. However, they were stopped in the semifinal game by Lithuania 67–64, and later lost 68–81 to the host team France in the bronze-medal game. Over 9 tournament games, Kuzmić averaged 3.1 points and 3.0 rebounds on 50% shooting from the field.

Kuzmić also represented Serbia at the EuroBasket 2017 where they won the silver medal, after losing in the final game to Slovenia. Over 9 tournament games, he averaged 7.1 points, 5.1 rebounds and 1.3 assists per game.

On 1 July 2019, Kuzmić was selected to the Serbia 18-man preliminary roster for the 2019 FIBA Basketball World Cup in China. On 15 July 2019, he was excluded from consideration due to the unpredictability of the recovery from the traffic accident he had been involved in a day earlier. Nikola Jovanović was called up in Kuzmić's place.

Personal life

2019 traffic accident
In the morning hours of 14 July 2019 on the Banja Luka-Prijedor state road near the village of Ramići, Kuzmić was involved in a serious traffic accident. Driving his Porsche SUV, the twenty-nine-year-old professional basketball player reportedly collided with a BMW vehicle going in the opposite direction while traveling at a high speed. He sustained life-threatening injuries in the accident, breaking his maxilla and mandible head bones (upper and lower jaws), as well as his chest. He was immediately placed in induced coma and airlifted via helicopter to the Clinical Centre of Serbia in Belgrade. Reportedly, thirty-year-old Bosnian professional boxer Dražan Janjanin was a passenger in the car that collided with Kuzmić's car.

Three days later, on 17 July 2019, Kuzmić underwent a surgery in which surgeons removed severe maxillofacial injuries. The next day after the surgery, 18 July 2019, he woke up from the coma. On 25 July 2019, Kuzmić was discharged from the hospital to home care.

See also

 List of Serbian NBA players

References

External links
 
 
 Ognjen Kuzmić at acb.com
 Ognjen Kuzmić at draftexpress.com
 Ognjen Kuzmić at espn.com
 Ognjen Kuzmić at eurobasket.com
 Ognjen Kuzmić at euroleague.net

1990 births
Living people
ABA League players
Baloncesto Málaga players
Basketball League of Serbia players
Bosnia and Herzegovina expatriate basketball people in Serbia
Bosnia and Herzegovina expatriate basketball people in the United States
Bosnia and Herzegovina men's basketball players
CB Axarquía players
Centers (basketball)
Golden State Warriors draft picks
Golden State Warriors players
Joventut Badalona players
KK Crvena zvezda players
KK FMP players
OKK Borac players
Kobrat players
Liga ACB players
National Basketball Association players from Bosnia and Herzegovina
National Basketball Association players from Serbia
Panathinaikos B.C. players
People from Doboj
Real Madrid Baloncesto players
Santa Cruz Warriors players
Serbia men's national basketball team players
Serbian expatriate basketball people in Finland
Serbian expatriate basketball people in Greece
Serbian expatriate basketball people in Spain
Serbian expatriate basketball people in the United States
Serbian men's basketball players
Serbs of Bosnia and Herzegovina